Gracey's Meat Hygiene is a veterinary textbook which deals with meat inspection and meat hygiene control. The eleventh edition of the book was published in 2015.

Background
The book is an expansion of the book Textbook of Meat Hygiene (by Horace Thornton and J. F. Gracey) which itself is an expansion of Thornton's Textbook of Meat Inspection (published 1949).

References 

2015 non-fiction books
English-language books
Wiley-Blackwell books
Veterinary medicine books
Meat inspection
1949 non-fiction books